Totnes ( or ) is a market town and civil parish at the head of the estuary of the River Dart in Devon, England, within the South Devon Area of Outstanding Natural Beauty. It is the administrative centre of the South Hams District Council.

Totnes has a long recorded history, dating back to 907, when its first castle was built. By the twelfth century it was already an important market town, and its former wealth and importance may be seen from the number of merchants' houses built in the sixteenth and seventeenth centuries.

Today, the town has a sizeable alternative and "New Age" community, and is known as a place where one can live a bohemian lifestyle. Two electoral wards mention Totnes (Bridgetown and Town). Their combined populations at the 2011 UK Census was 8,076.

History

Ancient and medieval history

According to the Historia Regum Britanniae written by Geoffrey of Monmouth in around 1136, "the coast of Totnes" was where Brutus of Troy, the mythical founder of Britain, first came ashore on the island. Set into the pavement of Fore Street is the Brutus Stone, a small granite boulder onto which, according to local legend, Brutus first stepped from his ship. As he did so, he was supposed to have declaimed:Here I stand and here I rest. And this town shall be called Totnes.

The stone is far above the highest tides and the tradition is not likely to be of great antiquity, being first mentioned in John Prince's Worthies of Devon in 1697. It is possible that the stone was originally the one from which the town crier, or bruiter called his bruit or news; or it may be le Brodestone, a boundary stone mentioned in several 15th century disputes: its last-known position in 1471 was below the East Gate.

The Middle English prose Brut places the fight between Brutus' general Corineus, and the British giant Gogmagog "at Totttenes", while Cornish antiquary Richard Carew suggested that the fight may have begun near the town, but ended at Plymouth Hoe. The Historia has several other landings at the Totness coast: the Roman general Vespasian, Constantine of Brittany at the port of Totnes, Aurelius Ambrosius and his brother Uther Pendragon attempting to win back the throne of Britain from the usurper Vortigern, the Saxons at war with King Arthur, and in one version Cadwallo fighting against the Mercians. The Historia also mentions the town in a prophecy of Merlin: "after [the dragon of Worcester] shall succeed the boar of Totness, and oppress the people with grievous tyranny. Gloucester shall send forth a lion, and shall disturb him in his cruelty, in several battles. He shall trample him under his feet, and terrify him with open jaws."

Despite this legendary history, the first authenticated history of Totnes is in AD 907, when it was fortified by King Edward the Elder as part of the defensive ring of burhs built around Devon, replacing one built a few years earlier at nearby Halwell. The site was chosen because it was on an ancient trackway which forded the river at low tide. Between the reigns of Edgar and William II (959–1100) Totnes intermittently minted coins. Some time between the Norman Conquest and the compilation of the Domesday Book, William the Conqueror granted the burh to Juhel of Totnes, who was probably responsible for the first construction of the castle. Juhel did not retain his lordship for long, however, as he was deprived of his lands in 1088 or 1089, for rebelling against William II.

The name Totnes (first recorded in AD 979) comes from the Old English personal name Totta and ness or headland. Before reclamation and development, the low-lying areas around this hill were largely marsh or tidal wetland, giving the hill much more the appearance of a "ness" than today.

By the 12th century, Totnes was already an important market town, due to its position on one of the main roads of the South West, in conjunction with its easy access to its hinterland and the easy navigation of the River Dart.

Modern history

By 1523, according to a tax assessment, Totnes was the second-richest town in Devon, and the sixteenth-richest in England, ahead of Worcester, Gloucester and Lincoln.
In 1553, King Edward VI granted Totnes a charter allowing a former Benedictine priory building that had been founded in 1088 to be used as Totnes Guildhall and a school. In 1624, the Guildhall was converted to be a magistrates' court. Soldiers were billeted here during the English Civil War and Oliver Cromwell visited for discussions with the general and parliamentary commander-in-chief Thomas Fairfax, 3rd Lord Fairfax of Cameron in 1646. Until 1887, the Guildhall was also used as the town prison with the addition of prison cells. It remained a magistrates' court until 1974. In 1990, a serious fire broke out on the High Street, resulting in the historic Eastgate structure being destroyed and an estimated £10 million in damage.

In 2006 Totnes become the first transition town of the transition initiative.
Permaculture designer Rob Hopkins developed this idea with his students and later with Naresh Giangrande developed the transition model in his home town of Totnes, which has since featured in many articles and films showing this concept. Totnes has adopted an Energy Descent Plan, as a response in answer to the twin problems of greenhouse gas emissions and peak oil. As a result of a series of large, well attended public gatherings with key experts from around the world, and the organisation of a number of special interest groups, the community has come together with lecturers and trainers shared with Schumacher College, through a process of participative strategic planning, to hone their skills in project development. As a result of the initiatives in Totnes, a large number of other communities have started "Transition Town" projects, and there are now more than 400 around the world, ranging from small communities to whole cities (e.g. Berlin). Totnes hosts the Sea Change Festival  that has been running in the town and neighbouring Dartington since 2016.

Governance
Totnes' borough charter was granted by King John, probably around 1206; at any rate, the 800th anniversary of the charter was celebrated in 2006, although Totnes lost its borough status in local government reorganisation in 1974. Totnes was served by Totnes electoral borough from 1295 until the reform act of 1867, but was restored by the 1884 Franchise Act. The constituency of Totnes was abolished a second time in 1983, and formed part of the South Hams constituency until 1997, when it was restored as the Totnes county constituency: as such it returns one Member of Parliament (MP) to Parliament.

In August 2009, Totnes became the first constituency to select the Conservative's Prospective Parliamentary Candidate through an open primary that was organised by the local Conservative Association.  Dr Sarah Wollaston won the Totnes primary in August 2009, and went on to be elected to Parliament at the 2010 general election. In 2019, she moved to Change UK, and then to the Liberal Democrats, for whom she contested Totnes in the 2019 general election, coming second when the seat reverted to the Conservatives.

In 2009, Totnes Rural was the only county division in Devon to elect a Green councillor.

Totnes has a mayor who is elected by the sixteen town councillors each year. Follaton House, on the outskirts of the town, is the headquarters of the South Hams District Council. The town is twinned with the French town of Vire, after which Vire Island on the River Dart near the "Plains" is named. There is also a local longstanding joke that Totnes is twinned with the fantasy land of Narnia.

Geography

The town is built on a hill rising from the west bank of the River Dart, which separates Totnes from the suburb of Bridgetown. It is at the lowest bridging point of the river which here is tidal and forms a winding estuary down to the sea at Dartmouth.

Today there are two road bridges, a railway bridge and a footbridge over the river in the town. Totnes Bridge is the nearest bridge to the sea and is a road bridge built in 1826–28 by Charles Fowler. At low tide the foundations of the previous stone bridge are visible just upstream—it was probably built in the early 13th century and widened in 1692. Before the first stone bridge was built there was almost certainly a wooden bridge here, and a tidal ford for heavy vehicles was just downstream. Its name, Brutus Bridge, was chosen by the local residents. Immediately upstream of the railway bridge is a footbridge, built in 1993 to provide access to the  terminus of the South Devon Railway.

Economy

Totnes has attracted a sizeable "alternative" community, and the town is known as a place where one can live a "New Age" lifestyle. There are a number of facilities for artists, painters and musicians, and there is a twice-weekly market offering antiques, musical instruments, second-hand books, handmade clothing from across the world, and local organically produced products. In 2007, Time magazine declared Totnes the capital of new age chic. In 2005, Highlife, the British Airways magazine, declared it one of the world's Top 10 Funky Towns.

In March 2007 Totnes was the first town in Britain to introduce its own local alternative currency, the Totnes pound, to support the local economy of the town. Fourteen months later, 70 businesses within the town were trading in the "Totnes Pound," accepting them as payment and offering them to shoppers as change from their purchases. The initiative is part of the transition town concept, which was pioneered by Rob Hopkins, who had recently moved to Totnes.

Emphasising the town's continuing history of boatbuilding, between 1998 and 2001 Pete Goss built his revolutionary but ill-fated 120-foot Team Philips catamaran there.

Loss of revenue from Dartington College of Arts which moved to Falmouth in 2010 was partially offset by increased tourism due to interest in Totnes's status as a transition town.

Landmarks
 Totnes is said to have more listed buildings per head than any other town.
The Norman motte-and-bailey Totnes Castle, now owned by English Heritage, was built during the reign of William I, probably by Juhel of Totnes. A prominent feature of the town is the Eastgate—an arch spanning the middle of the main street. This Elizabethan entrance to the walled town was destroyed in a fire in September 1990, but was rebuilt.

The ancient Leechwell, so named because of the supposed medicinal properties of its water, and apparently where lepers once came to wash, still provides fresh water. The Butterwalk is a Tudor covered walkway that was built to protect the dairy products once sold here from the sun and rain. Totnes Elizabethan House Museum is in one of the many authentic Elizabethan merchant's houses in the town, built around 1575.

Transport
The town also lies on the A381 between Newton Abbot and Salcombe. Totnes railway station is situated on the Exeter to Plymouth line, and has trains direct to London Paddington, Plymouth and Penzance, and as far north as Aberdeen. Nearby, Totnes (Riverside) railway station is at the southern end of the South Devon Railway Trust which runs tourist steam locomotives along the line that follows the River Dart up to Buckfastleigh. Since the River Dart is navigable to seagoing boats as far as Totnes, the estuary was used for the import and export of goods from the town until 1995.

Education
King Edward VI Community College more popularly known as KEVICC, is the local secondary school which shares its name with the former grammar school set up by King Edward VI over 450 years ago. At the western edge of the town is the Dartington Hall Estate, which includes the Schumacher College and, until July 2010, included Dartington College of Arts. There are also a number of alternative private schools in the Totnes area, providing primary and secondary education.

Notable people

Notable people from Totnes include:

Pegaret Anthony, World War II artist, was born in the town in 1915
 Charles Babbage had a strong family connection with the town and returned to attend the King Edward VI Grammar School for a period before going up to Cambridge.
 The novelist Desmond Bagley lived in Totnes from 1966 to 1976.
 William Brockedon, Artist and inventor, 1787–1854.  Son of Philip Brockedon, Clockmaker.
 James Brooke, the first Rajah of Sarawak, spent his final years in nearby Burrator, and Brooke's biographer claims "there is little doubt ... he was carnally involved with the rough trade of Totnes."
 Richard Burthogge, physician, magistrate and philosopher (1637/38–1705)
 Actor and dancer Emrhys Cooper grew up in Totnes.
 Sophie Dix, actress, born in Totnes.
 Sir William Elford, 1st Baronet, Recorder of the borough and artist
 Historian James Anthony Froude, author of History of England From the fall of cardinal Wolsey to the Defeat of the Spanish Armada, was born in Totnes.
 His brother Richard Hurrell Froude was a theologian; he belonged to a group of Anglicans who initiated the Oxford Movement in 1833.
 Television screenwriter and author David Gilman lives in Totnes.
 Humorous poet Matt Harvey is a resident.
 Rob Hopkins, founder of the Transition movement.
 Folk singer-songwriter Ben Howard was brought up and lives in Totnes.
 Singer-songwriter and filmmaker Cosmo Jarvis was raised in Totnes.
 Comic-book artists Jock, Dom Reardon and Lee O'Connor live and work in Totnes.
 Hebrew scholar, Benjamin Kennicott was also born in Totnes.
 Keith Law, Songwriter for Velvett Fogg lives in Totnes
 Linguist Edward Lye, who wrote the first dictionary of Anglo-Saxon, was born in Totnes.
 Rik Mayall previously lived in Totnes and is buried on his family estate, Hutcherleigh.
 Admiral Sir Frederick Thomas Michell KCB (1788–1873) mayor of Totnes 1855 to 1858.
 Captain Reynell Michell (1732-1802) Lord Mayor of Totnes from 1784 to 1802
 Mike Edwards, former cellist with the Electric Light Orchestra from 1972 to 1975, lived in Totnes in the later years of his life until his death in 2010.
 Joseph Mount, a musician who records under the name Metronomy, lived in Totnes for a while.
 Playwright Seán O'Casey lived in the town from 1938 to 1954.
 John Prince was vicar of Totnes in the late 17th century, was author of The Worthies of Devon, a major biographical work. He was also involved in a scandal, the court records of which were made into a book and stage play in the early 2000s.
William Reeve, composer, musician and actor, was organist of the church from 1781 to 1783 before moving to London to compose for Sadler's Wells and the Lyceum Theatre
 Sam Richards, musician and music teacher lives in Totnes
 Matt Roper, a character stand-up comic.
 Oliver St John represented the town in both the Short and the Long parliaments. One of the outstanding political leaders of the Parliamentary cause in the English Civil War. His reputation was made when he acted as lead counsel for John Hampden in the Ship Money case.
 William Stumbels, a clockmaker lived and worked in Totnes in the 18th century. (His workshop was possibly at No. 4 Castle Street, within the town walls.) Two of his clocks, a longcase (grandfather) and a turret clock, are displayed in Totnes Museum.
 Christopher Titmuss, an Insight Meditation meditation instructor and an author of books on Dharma
 Novelist Mary Wesley, author of The Camomile Lawn, spent her final years in Totnes.
 The explorer William John Wills of Burke and Wills expedition fame was born in Totnes. A memorial to Wills was erected using money from public subscriptions in 1864. It can still be seen on the Plains. There were originally two gas lamps attached to the monument, but both have since been removed.
 Film-score composer and mystery writer Bruce Montgomery (penname Edmund Crispin) lived in Totnes in the 1950s–60s.
The poet and writer John Lancaster lives in Totnes.

Arms

See also
 Totnes Museum
 Totnes Costume Museum
 Totnes Castle
 Totnes Community Hospital

References

External links

Battle to save celebrated cradle of cutting edge art (The Guardian)
Transition Town Totnes organisation

 
Towns in Devon
Civil parishes in South Hams